The Fishing industry in Niue contributes to the local economy and is popular with visitors. It has been described in fishing media as the "fisherman’s secret paradise". The island is rich in resources of Black, blue and striped Marlin, Skipjack, Yellowfin Tuna, Red Bass, Mahimahi, Sailfish, Wahoo and Giant Trevally. One of the notable charter boats operating is the Wahoo Fishing Charters, operated by Graham Marsh since 1983.  The largest charter vessel on the island is the  Horizon. Fishing on the island is considered a taboo on Sunday. Fresh fish caught is sold to restaurants such as Kaiika Restaurant in Alofi.

References

Niue
Economy of Niue